Gamasellus falciger is a species of mite in the family Ologamasidae.

References

falciger
Articles created by Qbugbot
Animals described in 1881